The Kyiv Zoo is one of the largest zoos in the former Soviet Union and the only large zoo in Kyiv, Ukraine.

History

The Kyiv Zoo was founded in 1909 by the Nature Lovers Society and was financed by various private donations. During its first years in business, the zoo experienced some hardships and therefore, did not contain many animals, just 17 different types. During the first winter the zoo was opened, the animals had to be kept in the food storage of the main Kyiv railway station, as the zoo's founders had not found a suitable shelter to keep the animals in during cold weather. Eventually, the shelter was found in the Kyiv Botanical Garden. As the zoo prospered, the number of animals had increased, limiting the space available. It was reported that stray animals frightened the employees of the garden.

Only 4 years after the zoo was founded it was given a relatively large, permanent area in the outskirts of Kyiv. In 1913 the animals premises received heating.

Since 1914, as the political instability in Imperial Russia tightened, the development of the zoo was held up. Only after the Russian Revolution ended did the zoo recover. During the 1940s (World War II), Kyiv was occupied by the Nazi German forces, and the zoo was being used by the German garrison. Fortunately, the animals were evacuated out of Kyiv, and later returned after the end of the war.

In 1970, the bird's pavilion was added, which is considered to be the largest in Europe to date. In 1982, the Animals Island was presented, separated from the visitors by small canals. The Animals Island houses the zoo's large cats (like lions and tigers).

In 1996, the zoo was admitted to the European Association of Zoos and Aquaria. However, it was expelled and banned in 2017 from the association, over poor conditions and mistreatment of animals. As at April 2018, the zoo is a "Candidate for Membership" of EAZA and as such is being supported towards resuming full membership.

In 2008, some 51 animals died in the zoo. A series of controversial deaths also unfolded in 2010 when the 39-year-old elephant of the zoo died on April 26, followed by a camel on May 26, and a bison on May 31. The city administration and the zoo authorities blamed poisoning of the animals as cause of the deaths, while animal rights activists accused the substandard living conditions, negligent handling and unqualified zoo administration.

In 2009, a Ukrainian postage stamp was introduced to mark the 100th anniversary of the zoo. In 2020, the zoo received a full renovation to improve the life of the animals in it. 

In response to concerns about Russian military build up at the border, zoo director Kyrylo Trantin, began to prepare for the possibility of invasion about a week before it began. Trantin, with the advice of a zoo director in Haifa, Israel, stocked up on food supplies and materials to build additional enclosures or to repair existing ones. The zoo closed down for an indefinite amount of time following the 2022 Russian invasion of Ukraine. Zookeepers said they were still keeping care of the animals inside, with about 50 staff members and about 30 family members living within the facility to care for the animals.

Description

According to CBC, the zoo has 2,600 animals from 328 species, including a pair of elephants. 130 different kinds of trees and bushes decorate the zoo's islands.

The zoo is also a research centre, working on acclimatization of far land animals, and preserving and reproduction of rare animals, such as the Amur tigers, bisons, Przewalski's Horses and some others. The zoo has since been refurbished since 2017.

Gallery

References

External links

 Kyiv Zoo Official website 
  Zoological Garden in Kyiv - unofficial website
 Kyiv Info - information about the zoo
 Kyiv Zoo getting ready for its 100th anniversary - The Day
 The story about Kyiv Zoo by the site «Photo of Kyiv, Ukraine, Europe and other world»

Tourist attractions in Kyiv
Zoos in Ukraine
Buildings and structures in Kyiv
Zoos established in 1909
1909 establishments in Ukraine
Prospect Beresteiskyi